Kenrick Bradshaw (born April 19, 1980) is an Aruban football player. He has played for the Aruba national team during the 1998 and 2002 FIFA World Cup qualifying rounds.

References

External links
 
 

1980 births
Living people
Aruban footballers
Aruba international footballers
Association football midfielders
SV Bubali players